Willam Thomas (1907 – 1972) was a Welsh rugby union and professional rugby league footballer who played in the 1930s.

Playing career

International honours
Billy Thomas played  in Wales' 18–23 defeat by England at Fartown Ground, Huddersfield on Wednesday 18 March 1931.

Challenge Cup Final appearances
Billy Thomas played , and was the captain in York's 8–22 defeat by Halifax in the 1930–31 Challenge Cup Final during the 1930–31 season at Wembley Stadium, London on Saturday 2 May 1931, in front of a crowd of 40,368.

County Cup Final appearances
Billy Thomas played  in York's 9–2 victory over Wakefield Trinity in the 1936 Yorkshire County Cup Final during the 1936–37 season at Headingley Rugby Stadium, Leeds on Saturday 17 October 1936.

References

1907 births
1972 deaths
Crawshays RFC players
Place of birth missing
Place of death missing
Rugby league five-eighths
Rugby league halfbacks
Swansea RFC players
Wales national rugby league team players
Welsh rugby league players
Welsh rugby union players
York Wasps captains
York Wasps players